Dumpy Mama is an album by American jazz saxophonist Sonny Stitt, featuring performances recorded in 1975 for the Flying Dutchman label.

Reception

In his review for AllMusic, Scott Yanow stated, "The playing is up to par if not overly memorable".

Track listing
 "Jason" (Sonny Stitt) - 7:30
 "Danny Boy for Ben" (Traditional) - 4:15  
 "Just Friends" (John Klenner, Sam M. Lewis) - 4:16  
 "Dumpy Mama" (Oliver Nelson) - 10:05  
 "It Might As Well Be Spring" (Richard Rodgers, Oscar Hammerstein II) - 7:00

Personnel
Sonny Stitt - tenor saxophone, alto saxophone, arranger
Frank Strozier - alto saxophone (tracks 1, 3 & 4)
Pee Wee Ellis - tenor saxophone (tracks 1, 3 & 4)
Mike Wofford - piano
Brian Torff - bass (tracks 1 & 3-5)
Shelly Manne - drums (tracks 1 & 3-5)
Ray Armando - Latin percussion (track 1, 3 & 4)

References

1975 albums
Albums produced by Bob Thiele
Flying Dutchman Records albums
RCA Records albums
Sonny Stitt albums